Sarh is a town in Kanpur district in the state of Uttar Pradesh, India.

Transport
Sarh is well connected by rail and road

Geography
It has an average elevation of 123 meters (406 feet).

Cities and towns in Kanpur Nagar district